Polyglossia refers to the coexistence of multiple languages (or distinct varieties of the same language) in one society or area. The term implies a living interaction between multiple languages within a single cultural system, producing significant effects on that culture. The word was used in a number of anthropology journals in the 1970s referencing multilingual communities in Malaysia, Singapore and the Caucasus region.

See also 
 Diglossia
 Heteroglossia

References 

Language
Linguistics terminology